Hell Has Harbour Views is a 2001 novel written by Richard Beasley. A 2005 ABC telemovie written and directed by Peter Duncan, was based on the novel.

Synopsis 
The story is set in a corrupt Sydney law firm and follows the protagonist, Hugh Walker, a lawyer who always hoped he would be a defender of the poor and oppressed, until a Sydney law firm dangled an office with a harbour view in front of him. In no time he is turning a blind eye to suspect time sheets, representing powerful companies against powerless people, and not being entirely honest with his girlfriend.

Development and publication 
Beasley began writing the novel while working at a small law firm and has stated that it is based on several stories and people.

It was first published in Australia through Pan Macmillan and has been published in print and ebook formats.

References

2001 Australian novels